An Everyman is stock character in drama. This person is an ordinary individual, with whom the audience is able to easily identify.

Everyman may also refer to:

Companies and organizations

Cinemas and theaters
 Everyman Cinemas, a chain of cinemas across London, Leeds, Surrey, and Hampshire.
 Everyman Palace Theatre, a theatre in Cork, Ireland
 Everyman Theatre, a theatre in Liverpool, England
  Everyman Theatre, a theatre in Cheltenham, England
 Everyman Theatre, Baltimore, a theater in Baltimore, Maryland

Others
 Everyman Chess, a publisher of chess books
 Everyman Films Limited, the production company of Patrick McGoohan and David Tomblin
 Everyman's Welfare Service (also known as "Everyman's"), Australian parachurch organization

Literature

Books and magazines
 Everyman (novel), a 2006 novel by Philip Roth
 Everyman's Library, a series of reprinted classic literature
 Everyman (magazine), an English magazine published from 1929–1935

Comic books
 Everyman (DC Comics), a shapeshifting member of Lex Luthor's Infinity Inc
 Everyman (Marvel Comics), a Marvel Comics super villain (Larry Eckler)
 Everyman (The Simpsons), a character created by Comic Book Guy

Plays
 Everyman (15th-century play), a 15th-century English medieval play
 Everyman (1901 play), a 1902 Broadway production based on the 15th-century medieval morality play

Other media
 Everyman (1961 film), a 1961 Austrian film based on a 1911 German-language play
 Everyman (1964 film), a 1964 Australian television play
 Everyman (TV series), a BBC television documentary series concerned with moral and religious issues
"Every Man", a song by the Christian band Casting Crowns
Everyman, a character appears in video games Undertale and Deltarune made by Toby Fox.

Other uses
 Everyman Campaign, a charity set up to research and raise awareness testicular and prostate cancer
 The Everyman sleep schedule, a form of polyphasic sleep
 Everyman, a logo element of PBS, see

See also
 Jedermann (disambiguation)
 Everywoman (disambiguation)
 Average Joe – wholly average person
 Commoner – person neither nobility, royalty, nor priesthood
Everyman's right – freedom to roam
Man on the Bondi tram – hypothetical reasonable Australian 
John Q. Public – generic, hypothetical "common man"
Straight man
Zé Povinho – Portuguese everyman